This is a list of all wild mammal species currently found in the U.S. state of Louisiana. Louisiana has a total of 70 mammal species within its borders.

This article presents the common and scientific names for the species, and extra information.

Eulipotyphla
Eulipotyphla are insectivorous mammals.

Bats
Bats are winged, omnivorous mammals capable of taking flight. There are five known species of bats that inhabit throughout the state of Louisiana.

References

Louisiana
mammals